Ariel Levy  (born 1974) is an American staff writer at The New Yorker magazine and the author of the books The Rules do Not Apply and Female Chauvinist Pigs: Women and the Rise of Raunch Culture.  Her work has appeared in The Washington Post, The New Yorker, Vogue, Slate, and The New York Times. Levy was named one of the "Forty Under 40" most influential out individuals in the June/July 2009 issue of The Advocate.

Early life and education 
Levy was raised in a Jewish family in Larchmont, New York, and attended Wesleyan University in the 1990s, graduating in 1996.  She says that her experiences at Wesleyan, which had "coed showers, on principle," strongly influenced her views regarding modern sexuality. After graduating from Wesleyan, she was briefly employed by Planned Parenthood but claims that she was fired because she is "an extremely poor typist." She was hired by New York magazine shortly thereafter.

Writings 
At The New Yorker magazine, where Levy has been a staff writer since 2008, she has written profiles of Cindy McCain, Silvio Berlusconi, Edith Windsor, Caster Semenya, Lamar Van Dyke, Mike Huckabee and Callista Gingrich. At New York magazine, where Levy was a contributing editor for 12 years, she wrote about John Waters, Stanley Bosworth, Donatella Versace, the writer George W. S. Trow, the feminist Andrea Dworkin, and the artists Ryan McGinley and Dash Snow.
Levy has explored issues regarding American drug use, gender roles, lesbian history and culture, and the popularity of U.S. pop culture staples such as Sex and the City. Some of these articles allude to Levy's personal thoughts on the status of modern feminism.

Levy criticized the pornographic video series Girls Gone Wild after she followed its camera crew for three days, interviewed both the makers of the series and the women who appeared on the videos, and commented on the series' concept and the debauchery she was witnessing.  Many of the young women Levy spoke with believed that bawdy and liberated were synonymous.

Levy's experiences amid Girls Gone Wild appear again in Female Chauvinist Pigs, in which she attempts to explain "why young women today are embracing raunchy aspects of our culture that would likely have caused their feminist foremothers to vomit."  In today's culture, Levy writes, the idea of a woman participating in a wet T-shirt contest or being comfortable watching explicit pornography has become a symbol of strength; she says that she was surprised at how many people, both men and women, working for programs such as Girls Gone Wild told her that this new "raunch" culture marked not the downfall of feminism but its triumph, but Levy was unconvinced.

Levy's work is anthologized in The Best American Essays of 2008, New York Stories, and 30 Ways of Looking at Hillary.

In 2013 The New Yorker published her essay, "Thanksgiving in Mongolia" about the loss of her newly-born son at 19 weeks while traveling alone in Mongolia. In March 2017, Random House published Levy's book, The Rules Do Not Apply: A Memoir, about her miscarriage, an affair, her spouse's alcoholism, and their eventual divorce.

Levy was the co-writer for Demi Moore's 2019 autobiography, Inside Out.

In April 2020, Levy wrote a controversial article for The New Yorker about Renee Bach, a white American missionary accused of pretending to be a medical professional and performing procedures on Ugandan children. Levy took a sympathetic view towards Bach. The group No White Saviors, whose co-founder, Kelsey Nielsen, was interviewed for the article, demanded a full retraction and apology, claiming Nielsen was misquoted and discredited, and that Levy "underrepresented and manipulated" the experiences of alleged victims and purposely left out evidence against Bach in the article.

Personal life 
Levy is openly bisexual. She married Amy Norquist in 2007. They divorced in 2012. Levy chronicled the divorce in her memoir. In 2017, she married John Gasson, a doctor from South Africa who tended to her during her miscarriage in Mongolia.

Bibliography

Books

Essays, reporting and other contributions  
 
 
 
 
 
 
 
 
 
 
 
 
 
 
 
 
 
 
———————
Notes

See also 
Feminist sex wars
Third-wave feminism
Pornographication

References

External links 

 New Yorker Archive
 New York magazine – Ariel Levy Archive
"Dispatches from Girls Gone Wild," Slate.com
 

Living people
Jewish feminists
American women journalists
American magazine editors
American women writers
American feminist writers
American LGBT journalists
Place of birth missing (living people)
LGBT Jews
People from Larchmont, New York
The New Yorker staff writers
Wesleyan University alumni
Anti-pornography feminists
Bisexual feminists
Jewish American journalists
1974 births
Women magazine editors
Women who experienced pregnancy loss
21st-century American Jews
21st-century LGBT people
21st-century American women
American bisexual writers